Squadra antimafia – Palermo oggi is an Italian police procedural television series that broadcast on Canale 5 from 2009 to 2016.

Synopsis 
In the first four seasons, set in Palermo, the story of the struggle have told between the state and the Mafia through the events of the deputy superintendent of police, Claudia Mares, head of anti-mafia squad of Palermo, and Rosy Abate, a young woman tied to a mafia clan, linked by a tragic past that has brought them together. The end of this cycle see the death of Mares.

The fifth season of the events move to Catania. The star will once again be Rosy Abate and the vice Lara Colombo, who both compete for the love of the vice chief Domenico Calcaterra in a somewhat challenge between the Mafia and justice.

Cast 

 Simona Cavallari:  Claudia Mares 
 Giulia Michelini:  Rosy Abate 
 Marco Bocci: Domenico Calcaterra
 Claudio Gioè: Ivan Di Meo
 Giordano De Plano: Sandro Pietrangeli
 Paolo Pierobon: Filippo De Silva
 Ana Caterina Morariu: Lara Colombo
 Valentina Carnelutti: Veronica Colombo
 Andrea Sartoretti: Dante Mezzanotte
 Greta Scarano: Francesca Leoni
 Ludovico Vitrano: Gaetano Palladino
 Dino Abbrescia: Vito Sciuto
 Roberto Salemi: Benito Caputo
 Alice Palazzi: Fiamma Rigosi
 Raffaele Vannoli: Gigante
 Sergio Friscia: Nardo Abate
 Serena Iansiti: Ilaria Abate
 Francesca Valtorta: Rachele Ragno
 Francesco Mandelli: Luca Serino
 Francesco Montanari: Achille Ferro
 Pino Caruso: Don Alfio Corvo
 Gianmarco Tognazzi: Giorgio Antonucci
 Massimo Corvo: Goffredo Pulvirenti
 Giuseppe Zeno: Vito Portanova
 Massimo De Santis: Armando Mezzanotte
 Tommaso Ramenghi: Umberto Nobile
 Luca Lionello: Tito Nerone
 Massimo Dobrovic: Narco-Colombiano
 Luigi Diberti: Oreste Ferro
 Edoardo Pesce: Michele Catena
 Alessandro Rugnone: Ruggero Spina
Giovanni Scifoni: Davide Tempofosco
Daniela Marra: Anna Cantalupo
Giulio Berutti: Carlo Nigro
Davide Iacopini: Giano Settembrini
Silvia D'Amico: Rosalia Bertinelli

Episodes

See also
List of Italian television series

External links
 

Italian television series
Canale 5 original programming